Christian Sautter (born 9 April 1940) is a French politician. He served as Minister for Economics, Finance, and Industry from 1999 to 2000 as part of Lionel Jospin's "Plural Left" government.

In 2014 Sautter was awarded with the Order of the Rising Sun, Gold and Silver Star.

References

External links
Christian Sautter, Adjoint chargé de l'emploi, du développement économique et de l'attractivité internationale

1940 births
Living people
French people of German descent
Socialist Party (France) politicians
French Ministers of Finance
Lycée Pasteur (Neuilly-sur-Seine) alumni
École Polytechnique alumni
French city councillors
Recipients of the Order of the Rising Sun, 2nd class